) is the relaxation of strained relations, especially political ones, through verbal communication. The diplomacy term originates from around 1912, when France and Germany tried unsuccessfully to reduce tensions.

The term is often used to refer to a period of general easing of the geopolitical tensions between the Soviet Union and the United States during the Cold War. It began in 1969, as a core element of the foreign policy of U.S. President Richard Nixon, in an effort to avoid nuclear escalation. The Nixon administration promoted greater dialogue with the Soviet government, including regular summit meetings and negotiations over arms control and other bilateral agreements.

Summary of Cold War détente
The period was characterized by the signing of treaties such as SALT I and the Helsinki Accords. Another treaty, SALT II, was discussed but never ratified by the U.S. There is still an ongoing debate among historians as to how successful the détente period was in achieving peace.

After the Cuban Missile Crisis in 1962, both the superpowers agreed to install a direct hotline between Washington and Moscow. The so-called red telephone enabled leaders of both countries to communicate with each other quickly in times of urgency and to reduce the chances of future crises escalating into an all-out war.

The American-Soviet détente was presented as an applied extension of that thinking. SALT II, in the late 1970s, continued the work of the SALT I talks by ensuring further reduction in arms by the Soviet Union and by the US. The Helsinki Accords, in which the Soviets promised to grant free elections in Europe, were called a major concession to ensure peace by the Soviets.

Détente ended after the Soviet intervention in Afghanistan, which led to the United States' boycott of the 1980 Olympics, held in Moscow. Ronald Reagan's election as president in 1980, based in large part on an anti-détente campaign, marked the definitive end of détente and a return to Cold War tensions. In his first press conference, Reagan said, "Détente's been a one-way street that the Soviet Union has used to pursue its aims." Relations continued to turn increasingly sour with the unrest in Poland, the end of the SALT II negotiations, and the NATO exercise in 1983, the last of which brought the superpowers almost to the brink of nuclear war. However, the State department under George P. Shultz took a more diplomatic approach beginning in 1983, purging anti-détente advocates from its leadership, with the strong support of Reagan and the Foreign Service. Formal negotiations for what was then known as "SALT III" began in 1983 which culminated in the START I. Diplomatic overtures were continued by the succeeding Bush administration up until the collapse of the Soviet Union in 1991; consequently, the period 1983–1991 is sometimes referred to as the second period of détente.

According to Eric Grynaviski, "Soviet and US decision-makers had two very different understandings about what détente meant" while simultaneously holding "an inaccurate belief that both sides shared principles and expectations for future behaviour."

Summits and treaties

The most obvious manifestations of détente were the series of summits between Soviet and U.S. leaders and the treaties that resulted from those meetings. In the early 1960s, before détente, the Partial Nuclear Test Ban Treaty was signed (5 August 1963). Later that decade, the January 1967 Outer Space Treaty and the July 1968 Treaty on the Non-Proliferation of Nuclear Weapons were two of the first building blocks of détente. The first treaties were signed all over the globe.

When Nixon came into office in 1969, several important détente treaties were developed. The Political Consultative Committee of the Warsaw Pact sent an offer to the U.S. and the rest of the West that urged a summit on "security and cooperation in Europe" to be held. The West agreed, and the Strategic Arms Limitation Talks began towards actual limits on the nuclear capabilities of both superpowers, which ultimately led to the signing of the SALT I treaty in 1972. It limited each power's nuclear arsenals but was quickly rendered outdated as a result of the development of MIRVs. Also in 1972, the Biological Weapons Convention and the Anti-Ballistic Missile Treaty were concluded, and talks on SALT II began the same year. The Washington Summit of 1973 further advanced mutual and international relations through discussion of diplomatic cooperation and continued discussion regarding limitations on nuclear weaponry.

In 1975, the Conference on Security and Cooperation (CSCE) in Europe met and produced the Helsinki Accords, a wide-ranging series of agreements on economic, political, and human rights issues. The CSCE was initiated by the Soviet Union and involved 35 states throughout Europe. One of the most prevalent issues after the conference was the question of human rights violations in the Soviet Union. The Soviet Constitution directly violated the Declaration of Human Rights of the United Nations, and that issue became a prominent point of separation between the United States and the Soviet Union.

The Carter administration had been supporting human rights groups inside the Soviet Union, and Leonid Brezhnev accused the US of interference in other countries' internal affairs. That prompted intense discussion of whether or not other nations may interfere if basic human rights, such as freedom of speech and religion, are violated. This basic disagreement between the superpowers, a democracy, and a one-party state, did not allow that issue to be reconciled. Furthermore, the Soviets proceeded to defend their internal policies on human rights by attacking American support of South Africa, Chile, and other countries that were known to violate many of the same human rights.

In July 1975, the Apollo–Soyuz Test Project became the first international space mission; three American astronauts and two Soviet cosmonauts docked their spacecraft and conducted joint experiments. The mission had been preceded by five years of political negotiation and technical co-operation, including exchanges of American and Soviet engineers between both countries' space centres.

Trade relations between both blocs increased substantially during the era of détente. Most significant were the vast shipments of grain that were sent from the West to the Soviet Union each year and helped to make up for the failure of the kolkhoz, the Soviet collective farms.

At the same time, the Jackson–Vanik Amendment, signed into U.S. federal law by U.S. President Gerald Ford on 3 January 1975 after a unanimous vote by both houses of the U.S. Congress, was designed to leverage trade relations between the Americans and the Soviets. It linked US trade to improvements in human rights in the Soviet Union, particularly by allowing refuseniks to emigrate. It also added to the most favoured nation status a clause that no country that resisted emigration could be awarded that status, which provided a method to link geopolitics to human rights.

End of Vietnam War
Richard Nixon and his National Security Adviser, Henry Kissinger, moved toward détente with the Soviet Union in the early 1970s. They hoped, in return, for Soviets to help the U.S. extricate or remove itself from Vietnam. People then started to notice the consciousness with which US politicians started to act.

Strategic Arms Limitations Talks

Richard Nixon and Leonid Brezhnev signed an ABM treaty in Moscow on 26 May 1972 as well as the Interim Agreement (SALT I), which temporarily capped the number of strategic arms (MIRVs, SLBMs, and ICBMs). That was a show of détente militarily since an expansion of nuclear ballistic arms had started to occur.

The goal of Nixon and Kissinger was to use arms control to promote a much broader policy of détente, which could then allow the resolution of other urgent problems through what Nixon called "linkage." David Tal argued:

Apollo–Soyuz handshake in space

A significant example of an event contributing to détente was the handshake that took place in space. In July 1975, the first Soviet-American joint space flight was conducted, the Apollo–Soyuz Test Project. Its primary goal was the creation of an international docking system, which would allow two different spacecraft to join in orbit. That would allow both crews on board to collaborate on space exploration. The project marked the end of the Space Race, which had started in 1957 with the launch of Sputnik 1, and allowed tensions between the Americans and the Soviets to decrease significantly.

Continued conflicts
As direct relations thawed, increased tensions continued between both superpowers through their proxies, especially in the Third World. Conflicts in South Asia and the Middle East in 1973 saw the Soviet Union and the U.S. backing their respective surrogates, such as in Afghanistan, with war material and diplomatic posturing. In Latin America, the U.S. continued to block any left-wing electoral shifts in the region by supporting unpopular right-wing military coups and military dictatorships. Meanwhile, there were also many communist or left-wing guerrillas around the region, which were militarily and economically backed by the Soviet Union, China and Cuba.

During much of the early détente period, the Vietnam War continued to rage. Both sides still mistrusted each other, and the potential for nuclear war remained constant, notably during the 1973 Yom Kippur War when the United States raised its alert level to DEFCON III, the highest since the Cuban Missile Crisis.

Both sides continued aiming thousands of nuclear warheads atop intercontinental ballistic missiles (ICBMs) at each other's cities, maintaining submarines with long-range nuclear weapon capability (submarine-launched ballistic missiles, or SLBMs) in the world's oceans, keeping hundreds of nuclear-armed aircraft on constant alert, and guarding contentious borders in Korea and Europe with large ground forces. Espionage efforts remained a high priority, and defectors, reconnaissance satellites, and signal intercepts measured each other's intentions to try to gain a strategic advantage.

Cold War flares up in 1979

The 1979 Soviet invasion of Afghanistan, carried out in an attempt to shore up a struggling pro-Soviet regime, led to harsh international criticisms, and a boycott of the 1980 Summer Olympics, held in Moscow. U.S. President Jimmy Carter boosted the budget of the US Defense Department and began financial aid to the office of Pakistani President Muhammad Zia-ul-Haq, who, in turn, subsidized the anti-Soviet radical Islamist group of mujahideen fighters in Afghanistan.

Another contributing factor in the decline in the popularity of détente as a desirable U.S. policy was the interservice rivalry between the US State Department and Department of Defense. From 1973 to 1977, there were three secretaries worth mentioning: Elliot Richardson, James Schlesinger, and Donald Rumsfeld. Schlesinger's tenure as Secretary of Defense was plagued by notably poor relations with Kissinger, one of the most prominent advocates of détente in the U.S. Their poor working relationship bled into their professional relationship, and policy clashes would increasingly occur. They ultimately resulted in Schlesinger's dismissal in 1975. However, his replacement, Rumsfeld, had similar issues with Kissinger although their disagreements stemmed more from domestic resistance to détente.

As a result, clashes on policy continued between the State and the Defense Departments. Rumsfeld thought that Kissinger was too complacent about the growing Soviet strength. Although Rumsfeld largely agreed with Kissinger's that the United States held military superiority over the Soviet Union, he argued that Kissinger's public optimism would prevent Congress from allowing the Defense Department the funds that Rumsfeld believed were required to maintain the favorable gap between the US and the Soviets. Rumsfeld responded by regularly presenting a more alarmist view of the superior strength of the Soviets.

In response to the stranglehold of influence by Kissinger in the Nixon and Ford administrations and the later decline in influence over foreign policy by the Department of Defense, Richardson, Schlesinger, and Rumsfeld all used the growing antipathy in the U.S. for the Soviet Union to undermine Kissinger's attempts to achieve a comprehensive arms reduction treaty. That helped to portray the entire notion of détente as an untenable policy.

The 1980 American presidential election saw Ronald Reagan elected on a platform opposed to the concessions of détente. Negotiations on SALT II were abandoned as a result. However, during the later years of Reagan's presidency, he and Soviet General Secretary Mikhail Gorbachev pursued a policy that was considered to be détente.

However, the Reagan administration talked about a "winnable" nuclear war and led to the creation of the Strategic Defense Initiative and the Third World policy of funding irregular and paramilitary death squads in Central America, sub-Saharan Africa, Cambodia, and Afghanistan.

Cuban thaw

On 17 December 2014, U.S. President Barack Obama and Cuban President Raúl Castro resolved to restore diplomatic relations between Cuba and the United States. The restoration agreement had been negotiated in secret in the preceding months. The negotiations were facilitated by Pope Francis and hosted mostly by the Canadian government, which had warmer relations with Cuba at that time. Meetings were held in both Canada and the Vatican City. The agreement would see some United States travel restrictions lifted, fewer restrictions on remittances, greater access to the Cuban financial system for United States banks, and the reopening of the United States embassy in Havana and the Cuban embassy in Washington, which both closed in 1961 after the breakup of diplomatic relations as a result of Cuba's alliance with the Soviet Union. On 14 April 2015, the Obama administration announced the removal of Cuba from the State Sponsors of Terrorism list. Cuba was officially removed from the list on 29 May 2015. On 20 July 2015, the Cuban and U.S. interest sections in Washington and Havana were upgraded to embassies. On 24 March 2016, Obama became the first U.S. president to visit Cuba, since 1928.

However, in 2017, Donald Trump – who had succeeded Obama as United States' president – stated that he was "canceling" the Obama administration's deals with Cuba, while also expressing that a new deal could be negotiated between the Cuban and United States governments.

See also

 Appeasement
 Containment
 Entente (type of alliance)
 Rollback
 Russian reset

References

Sources
 
 
 
 
 
 
 
 
 
 
 
 
 

Cold War
Cold War history of the United States
Cold War terminology
Communism
Marxism
Richard Nixon
Foreign relations of China
China–United States relations
Foreign relations of Cuba
Foreign relations of Iran
Iran–United States relations
Foreign relations of Laos
Laos–United States relations
Foreign relations of Nicaragua 
Nicaragua–United States relations
Foreign relations of North Korea
North Korea–United States relations
Foreign relations of Venezuela 
United States–Venezuela relations
Foreign relations of Vietnam
Foreign relations of Russia
Russia–United States relations
Foreign relations of the Soviet Union
Soviet Union–United States relations